Tony Lambert is a former British diplomat to Beijing, China and Tokyo, Japan and author of several significant books regarding Christianity in China.

Works authored
 China's Christian Millions (New Edition, Fully Revised and Updated) (2006)
 Counting Christians in China: a cautionary report.: An article from: International Bulletin of Missionary Research (2005)
 The Resurrection of the Chinese Church (1994)

References

Notes

British diplomats
Christian writers
Living people

British expatriates in China
Year of birth missing (living people)